Broadus may refer to:

 Broadus, Montana, United States
 Broadus Airport, a general aviation airport in  Montana, United States

People
Surname
 Bruce Edward Broadus (1966–1996), American R&B singer and songwriter of the group Damian Dame
 Snoop Dogg (born Calvin Cordozar Broadus, Jr. in 1971), American rapper
 John Albert Broadus (1827–1895), American Baptist pastor
 Kevin Broadus (born 1964), head men's basketball coach at Binghamton University

Given name
 John Broadus Watson (1878–1958), American psychologist
 Broadus Erle (1918–1977), American violinist
 Bodie Broadus, a fictional character on the television drama The Wire